James Horwill (born 29 May 1985) is an Australian former rugby union player, who has played for the Australian national side, with 61 caps to his name. He captained the Wallabies a number of times, including during the 2011 Rugby World Cup. Horwill played ten seasons in Super Rugby for the Queensland Reds, followed by four seasons with English club Harlequins. His position was second row.

Personal life
Horwill was born in Brisbane, Queensland, and educated at Brisbane Boys College.

As of February 2016, he was living in south west London, with his wife. James has a multimillion-dollar Brisbane property portfolio.

Club career

Queensland Reds

Horwill made his Super 14 debut against arch rivals the New South Wales Waratahs in the first game of the 2006 season, after not even being included in the Reds original squad.

Horwill captained the Queensland Reds to a season victory in the 2011 in the Super Rugby competition, his sixth season played at that level

Overall, Horwill played more than 129 times for the Queensland Reds, including 116 Super Rugby caps for the Reds.
When his departure was announced the Queensland Rugby CEO Jim Carmichael described him as "one of the great modern-day sporting treasures of Queensland."

Harlequins

On 17 December 2014, it was announced that Horwill had signed a three-year contract with English Premiership side Harlequins.  He made his competitive debut in Quins' season opener against Wasps FC on 16 October 2015 and immediately established himself as a first choice in the team.  He scored his debut points with a try in the match against Saracens F.C. on 9 January 2016. He also captained the side in the absence of Quins' England players.

Horwill played his last season for Harlequins in 2018-19 before retiring from professional rugby. He then played for Cambridge University R.U.F.C. in the 2019 Varsity match.

International career

Horwill proved to be the find of the 2006 season, forcing his way into the starting line up and earning a place in the Wallabies spring tour, playing for Australia A in all three of the matches.

In 2007,  Horwill made his debut for the Wallabies in a test match against Fiji playing the entire game, and was unlucky to not have been included in the 2007 Rugby World Cup squad.  2008 was a successful year for Horwill, as he broke into the starting Wallabies team and played 9 games in 2008, starting against New Zealand in the Bledisloe Cup.

In August 2011, Robbie Deans named James Horwill as captain for the 2011 Rugby World Cup in New Zealand. He debuted as captain in the deciding match of the 2011 Tri Nations series on 27 August 2011 and led the Wallabies to a series victory.

Horwill was captain of the Wallabies for the British and Irish Lions tour to Australia in 2013.  Controversially, after an appeal by the IRB, Horwill was cleared of allegedly stamping on Alun Wyn Jones face during the first test.

He played his final game for the Wallabies in The Rugby Championship game against the All Blacks in Auckland on 15 August 2015. The following week, Australian coach Michael Cheika decided to leave Horwill out of his 31-man squad for the 2015 Rugby World Cup, a move which surprised some observers.

References

External links

Wallabies Profile
Queensland Reds Profile
itsrugby.co.uk Profile
ESPN Profile

1985 births
Australian rugby union players
Australia international rugby union players
Australian rugby union captains
Queensland Reds players
Brisbane City (rugby union) players
Rugby union locks
People educated at Brisbane Boys' College
Living people
Harlequin F.C. players
Australian expatriate rugby union players
Australian expatriate sportspeople in England
Expatriate rugby union players in England
Barbarian F.C. players
Cambridge University R.U.F.C. players
Rugby union players from Brisbane